The 2012 Ladbrokes Irish Greyhound Derby Final took place on 8 September 2012 at Shelbourne Park.

The winner Skywalker Puma won €120,000 and was trained by Frances O'Donnell, owned by Ray Patterson and bred by Paddy Purtill.

Final result
At Shelbourne Park (over 550 yards):

Competition Report
Dolores Ruth entered her four Razldazl greyhounds for the 2012 Irish Derby still trying to recover from her bad luck experience during the 2012 English Greyhound Derby final. The Razldazl team of Jayfkay, Rioga, Bugatti and her defending champion George led the ante-post betting followed closely by Scottish Greyhound Derby champion Barefoot Allstar, Northern Irish Derby champion Captain Scolari, Champion Stakes winner & runner-up Droopys Jet and Ballymac Vic and the Tyrur brothers Big Mike & McGuigan, the latter was the 2010 champion.

In the preliminary round Razldazl George only finished fourth and Captain Scolari fifth but the pair were lucky because they still qualified for the next round. Ballymac Vic and Tyrur Big Mike both won well but Razldazl Jayfkay was a shock elimination.

After round two Phil Gough's Sparta Maestro became the new favourite after two fast wins but Tyrur Big Mike finished lame and Tyrur McGuigan, Rockchase Bullet and Captain Scolari were all eliminated. There were further surprises in the third round as Sparta Maestro, Barefoot Allstar and Razldazl Rioga were all defeated but Ballymac Vic recorded a fast 29.44 success.
 
In the quarter finals Droopys Jet beat Razldazl George by a short head before Laughil Billy won the second in 29.61. Ballymac Vic was eliminated in a troubled heat won by Kilbarry Rover and the fourth and final heat was taken by Tyrur Sugar Ray who set the fastest time of 29.29.

In the semi-finals Skywalker Puma overtook early leader Razldazl Bugatti and pulled clear of the field by over six lengths, Bugatti faded badly finishing last with Camas and Coolykereen Imp qualifying for the final. The second semi was won by Cuil Cougar from Tyrur Sugar Ray and Razldazl George with Droopys Jet failing to get to final.

Skywalker Puma trained by Frances O'Donnell finished the race very strongly to catch early leader Cuil Cougar. Cougar had led for most of the race and just failed to hold off Skywalker Puma who went on to win by a head. Defending champion Razldazl George performed well to take third place but finished lame and retired.

Quarter finals

Semi finals

See also
2012 UK & Ireland Greyhound Racing Year

References

External links
Irish Greyhound Board
Greyhound Data

Greyhound Derby
Irish Greyhound Derby
Irish Greyhound Derby
Irish Greyhound Derby, 2012